Crazy Dandy  (Spanish: Loco lindo) is a 1936  Argentine comedy film directed by Arturo S. Mom and written by José B. Cairola and Conrado Nalé Roxlo. Starring Luis Sandrini and Sofía Bozán the film premiered in Buenos Aires on July 13, 1936. Carlos Rinaldi worked as a laboratory assistant on the film.

Main cast

Luis Sandrini as  Miguelito Andrade
Sofía Bozán as  Negra
Tomás Simari as  Don Florencio
Antonio Capuano
Ricardo de Rosas
Ernesto Fama as Cantor
Pedro Fiorito as Peralta
Fausto Fornoni
Francisco García Garaba
Alfredo Gobbi
Miguel Gómez Bao as Transpunte
Anita Jordán as Carmencita
Miguel Mileo
Raimundo Pastore as Braulio
Rosa Rosen as Muchacha en almacén
Juan Sarcione as Ponciano
Susana Vargas

Gallery of stills

External links

1936 films
1930s Spanish-language films
Argentine black-and-white films
1936 comedy films
Films directed by Arturo S. Mom
Argentine comedy films
1930s Argentine films